Emilio Fernando Azcárraga Jean III (born 21 February 1968) is a Mexican businessman who currently serves as the chairman of both mass media company Televisa and professional football team Club América.

In 1997, at the age of 29, Azcárraga Jean became the CEO of Grupo Televisa – which had been founded by his family in 1973 – following the death of his father Emilio Azcárraga Milmo. He led Televisa for twenty years, and was credited with the financial turnaround of a highly indebted and struggling company. Under Azcárraga Jean, Televisa expanded its satellite TV, cable and telecommunications businesses, however the rise of the internet and growing competition are considered the main reasons behind years of declining advertising revenue. He stepped down from his role as CEO in 2017, though still serves as the company’s chairman of the board.

Early life and education 
He was born in Mexico City in 1968. His father is Emilio Azcárraga Milmo and his mother is Nadine Jean, a French citizen and third wife of Azcárraga Milmo.

He attended Lakefield College School in Ontario, Canada, and Universidad Iberoamericana until fifth semester.

Career 
He became the CEO of Grupo Televisa at the age of 29, after the death of his father. He is  one of the richest businesspersons in Latin America, ranked seventh-richest in Mexico and 512th-richest globally with a fortune estimated at $2.3 billion as of March 2011.

He is also a Board Member of Univision and Banamex. Azcárraga Jean is also a global board member of Endeavor. Endeavor is an international non-profit development organization that finds and supports high-impact entrepreneurs in emerging markets.

Azcárraga Jean is widely credited for turning around Televisa into the prosperous company after the death of his father. Azcárraga, together with his close friends and colleagues José Bastón, Alfonso de Angoitia Noriega and Bernardo Gómez were able to bring Televisa back from a near bankruptcy.

On October 26, 2017, Televisa announced that Azcárraga Jean was stepping down as CEO of the firm on January 1, 2018. This decision came amid Televisa's declining advertisement sales and growing competition in the online market.

Ancestors

Awards and honors
 2004, Golden Plate Award of the American Academy of Achievement
 2012, Grand Order of Solidarity Award of the Organizacion Internacional de Teletones (Oritel)
 2014, Broadcasting & Cable Hall of Fame
 2014, Tarikoff Legacy Award
 2017, International Emmy Directorate Award

See also
Azcárraga family
List of billionaires

References

External links 
 Profile on Endeavor's Board of Directors
 

1968 births
Emilio Azcarraga Jean
Lakefield College School alumni
Mexican football chairmen and investors
Universidad Iberoamericana alumni
Living people
Businesspeople from Mexico City
Mexican billionaires
Mexican mass media owners
Mexican people of Basque descent
Mexican people of English descent
Mexican people of French descent
Mexican people of Irish descent
Magazine publishers (people)
Mexican newspaper publishers (people)
International Emmy Directorate Award
Mexican television executives
Chairmen of Televisa